Maxwell Spalding Dougan (born 23 May 1938) is a Scottish former professional footballer.

Career

After playing amateur football for Queen's Park, Dougan turned professional in 1963 as he signed for English club Leicester City. After three years and only nine league appearances however, Dougan moved on to join Luton Town. At Luton he was utilised more frequently, playing 132 matches over the course of his four seasons with the club. In 1970, he joined Bedford Town, before a period with Dunstable Town.

References

1938 births
Living people
Scottish footballers
English Football League players
Queen's Park F.C. players
Leicester City F.C. players
Luton Town F.C. players
Bedford Town F.C. players
Dunstable Town F.C. players
Scottish Football League players
Scotland amateur international footballers
Association football defenders